Ngao is a district (amphoe) of Lampang province, northern Thailand.

Geography
Neighboring districts are (from the south clockwise): Mae Mo, Chae Hom and Wang Nuea of Lampang Province, Mueang Phayao and Dok Khamtai of Phayao province, and Song of Phrae province.

The Phi Pan Nam Mountains dominate the landscape of the district. A section of Tham Pha Thai National Park is in Ngao District.

History
Originally named Mueang Ngao, the district was renamed Ngao in 1938, as the prefix Mueang was then reserved for the capital districts of the provinces.

Administration

Central administration 
The district Ngao is subdivided into 10 subdistricts (Tambon), which are further subdivided into 85 administrative villages (Muban).

Local administration 
There are 2 subdistrict municipalities (Thesaban Tambon) in the district:
 Luang Nuea consisting of the complete subdistrict Luang Nuea.
 Luang Tai consisting of the complete subdistrict Luang Tai.

There are 8 subdistrict administrative organizations (SAO) in the district:
 Ban Pong consisting of the complete subdistrict Ban Pong.
 Ban Rong consisting of the complete subdistrict Ban Rong.
 Pong Tao consisting of the complete subdistrict Pong Tao.
 Na Kae consisting of the complete subdistrict Na Kae.
 Ban On consisting of the complete subdistrict Ban On.
 Ban Haeng consisting of the complete subdistrict Ban Haeng.
 Ban Huat consisting of the complete subdistrict Ban Huat.
 Mae Tip consisting of the complete subdistrict Mae Tip.

References

External links
amphoe.com (Thai)

Ngao